Kilmarnock bus station is a bus station in Kilmarnock, Scotland.

History 
The bus station was built in 1974 and replaced a bus station in Portland Street.

A project to redevelop the bus station started in November 2019 and was initially expected to be completed by spring 2020. However, the project was delayed after the contractor went bankrupt in March 2020.

Seating at the bus station was removed on 2 June 2020. It was subsequently claimed that this was to reduce the spread of COVID-19. In February 2021, new rests for passengers to lean on were installed, replacing the traditional seating. The new seating faced criticism due to accessibility concerns and in September 2021, council officers stated that it would be replaced.

In September 2022, Stagecoach West Scotland stated that it would no longer serve the bus station after 6pm due to anti-social behaviour.

References 

Kilmarnock
Bus stations in Scotland
1974 establishments in Scotland